"Someone Else May Be There While I'm Gone" is a World War I era song written by Irving Berlin and published as sheet music in 1917. The song, recorded by Al Jolson for Columbia Records (catalog No. A-2124) on September 19, 1916 was very popular that year.
 Jolson recorded it again for Decca Records (catalog No. 24398) on December 5, 1947.

References

External links
Audio file of Someone Else May Be There While I'm Gone  

Songs about parting
1916 songs
Songs written by Irving Berlin
Al Jolson songs
Songs of World War I